The 1960 United States presidential election in Georgia took place on November 8, 1960, as part of the 1960 United States presidential election. Georgia voters chose 12 representatives, or electors, to the Electoral College, who voted for president and vice president.

Georgia was won by Senator John F. Kennedy (D–Massachusetts), running with Senator Lyndon B. Johnson, with 62.54% of the popular vote against incumbent Vice President Richard Nixon (R–California), running with United States Ambassador to the United Nations Henry Cabot Lodge, Jr., with 37.43% of the popular vote. This is the first election where any Georgia county cast more than one hundred thousand votes, namely Fulton.

Results

Results by congressional districts

Results by county

Notes

References

Georgia
1960
1960 Georgia (U.S. state) elections